Hamza Banoub (1984 – 23 June 2012) was an Algerian footballer. During his career he played for CA Batna, MO Constantine, CR Belouizdad and AS Khroub.

He died on 23 June 2012 at the age of 28 after suffering a heart attack during a charity football match.

References

1984 births
2012 deaths
Algerian footballers
Association footballers not categorized by position
21st-century Algerian people
Association football players who died while playing
Sport deaths in Algeria